Gudeodiscus fischeri is a species of air-breathing land snail, a terrestrial pulmonate gastropod mollusk in the family Plectopylidae.

Distribution
The distribution of Gudeodiscus fischeri includes Vietnam.

Ecology
It is a ground-dwelling species as all other plectopylid snails in Vietnam.

Gudeodiscus anceyi and Gudeodiscus emigrans quadrilamellatus live at geographically close sites to Gudeodiscus fischeri.

References

Plectopylidae
Gastropods described in 1901